The 2013–14 Texas State Bobcats men's basketball team represented Texas State University during the 2013–14 NCAA Division I men's basketball season. The Bobcats, led by first year head coach Danny Kaspar, played their home games at Strahan Coliseum and were first year members of the Sun Belt Conference. They finished the season 8–23, 4–14 in Sun Belt play to finish in last place. They failed to qualify for the Sun Belt tournament.

Roster

Schedule

|-
!colspan=9 style="background:#500000; color:#CFB53B;"| Exhibition

|-
!colspan=9 style="background:#500000; color:#CFB53B;"| Regular season

References

Texas State Bobcats men's basketball seasons
Texas State
2013 in sports in Texas
2014 in sports in Texas